Cyrtocarenum grajum is a trapdoor spider species found in Greece and Crete.

See also 
 List of Ctenizidae species

References 

Ctenizidae
Spiders of Europe
Spiders described in 1836